Gastroenterology is the official medical journal of the American Gastroenterological Association. Its first issue was published in 1943. It is currently published by Elsevier. According to the Journal Citation Reports, the journal has a 2020 impact factor of 22.682, ranking it 4th among 92 journals in the category "Gasteroenterology & Hepatology".

References

External links 
 

Elsevier academic journals
Publications established in 1943
Gastroenterology and hepatology journals
English-language journals
Academic journals associated with learned and professional societies
Journals published between 13 and 25 times per year